Christopher L. Streveler (born January 6, 1995) is an American football quarterback for the New York Jets of the National Football League (NFL). He played college football at Minnesota and South Dakota. After going undrafted in 2018, Streveler played two seasons as a backup quarterback for the Winnipeg Blue Bombers of the Canadian Football League (CFL), where they won the 107th Grey Cup championship in 2019. He has also played for the Arizona Cardinals.

College career
Streveler started his college career playing for the Minnesota Golden Gophers, where he played for three years, before transferring to the University of South Dakota. Streveler then played two years with the South Dakota Coyotes. There, he threw for 6,081 yards and 54 touchdowns, earning the MVFC Offensive Player of the Year award in 2017. He was a runner-up for the Walter Payton Award.

Statistics

Professional career

Winnipeg Blue Bombers

2018
Streveler signed with the Winnipeg Blue Bombers of the Canadian Football League on May 4, 2018, after going undrafted in the 2018 NFL Draft. He was expected to compete with Blue Bombers' quarterbacks Matt Nichols, Darian Durant and Alex Ross in training camp. However, the presumptive backup quarterback, Darian Durant, retired before the start of training camp. The Blue Bombers signed quarterback Bryan Bennett to compete with Streveler and Ross for backup behind Nichols. On June 1, 2018, Streveler played in his first preseason game with the Blue Bombers, going 10 for 10 with 140 yards and an 80-yard touchdown pass. On June 6, Nichols suffered an injury in practice that would later sideline him for four to six weeks to open the 2018 season. Instead of signing a veteran quarterback to lead the team, the Blue Bombers elected to start Streveler to open the season. Streveler became the first quarterback to start a CFL game coming out of college since 1994, when future Hall of Famer Anthony Calvillo started for the Las Vegas Posse. Streveler won his first CFL match in Week 2 when the Bombers defeated the Alouettes 56–10. Streveler started the first three games of the season for the Bombers before starting quarterback Nichols returned from injury. Streveler continued to be utilized as a rusher and rotational passer, and finished the season by completing 86 out of 140 passes for 1,134 yards and 11 touchdowns against five interceptions. On the ground, Streveler had 77 carries for 441 yards and 10 more scores.

2019
The 2019 season began with Streveler as the backup quarterback to Matt Nichols. Nichols suffered an injury in Week 10 and was placed on the six-game injured reserve list, which promoted Streveler to the starting role. Despite completing only seven passes for 89 yards Streveler was able to lead the Bombers to a win thanks in part to his rushing performance in which he gained 95 yards and scored a touchdown. Streveler remained the Bombers starting quarterback for eight matches, winning three of those games and losing five. He suffered an injury in Week 19 and was relegated to the injured list for the Bombers final game of the regular season, as the team announced veteran Zach Collaros as the starting quarterback; whom the Bombers had traded for on trade deadline day only a couple weeks prior. Streveler finished 2019 with 1,564 yards passing and eight touchdowns, compared to 14 interceptions in 17 games played. On 127 carries, he put up 726 yards and 12 more majors. Competing as a running option to Collaros, the West Semi-Final victory over the Calgary Stampeders saw Streveler set a CFL playoff record when he took 23 snaps at quarterback without attempting a pass. Streveler played a limited role in the West Final against the Saskatchewan Roughriders, with only one pass attempt and four carries for 10 yards. The Bombers still won and got a chance to compete in the 107th Grey Cup in Calgary. In the championship game, Streveler played a much larger role, throwing a touchdown pass to Andrew Harris, rushing for thirty yards, and catching a pass from Darvin Adams, as the Bombers won their 11th Grey Cup, their first in 29 years.

Following the season, it was reported that Streveler had scheduled workouts with three NFL teams: the Arizona Cardinals, Tampa Bay Buccaneers and Miami Dolphins. He was released on February 3, 2020 in order to pursue NFL opportunities, reportedly with the Cardinals.

Arizona Cardinals
On February 4, 2020, Streveler signed a reserve/future contract with the Arizona Cardinals. Streveler made his NFL debut on September 13, 2020, playing one snap and rushing three yards for a first down as the Cardinals defeated the San Francisco 49ers 24–20. Streveler took over as quarterback in Week 17 (January 3, 2021), replacing the injured Kyler Murray and leading the team to a 18–7 loss against the Los Angeles Rams.  During the game, Streveler threw for 105 yards, one touchdown, and one interception.

Streveler entered the 2021 season as the Cardinals third-string quarterback behind Kyler Murray and Colt McCoy. On November 22, 2021, Streveler was waived by the Cardinals.

Baltimore Ravens
On November 29, 2021, Streveler was signed to the Baltimore Ravens' practice squad.

Miami Dolphins
On February 22, 2022, Streveler signed with the Miami Dolphins. He was waived by the Dolphins on May 18, 2022.

New York Jets
On July 26, 2022, Streveler signed with the New York Jets. Despite a strong preseason performance, he was waived on August 30, 2022 and signed to the practice squad the next day. 

In Week 16, Streveler replaced a struggling Zach Wilson in the Jets' 19–3 loss to the Jacksonville Jaguars. He completed 10-of-15 passes for 90 yards and rushed 9 times for 54 yards. He signed a reserve/future contract on January 9, 2023.

Career statistics

CFL career statistics

NFL career statistics

References

External links

Minnesota Golden Gophers bio
New York Jets bio

1995 births
Living people
American players of Canadian football
American football quarterbacks
Arizona Cardinals players
Baltimore Ravens players
Canadian football quarterbacks
South Dakota Coyotes football players
Sportspeople from the Chicago metropolitan area
People from Crystal Lake, Illinois
Players of American football from Illinois
Winnipeg Blue Bombers players
Minnesota Golden Gophers football players
Miami Dolphins players
New York Jets players